Herkimer is an unincorporated community in Marshall County, Kansas, United States.  As of the 2020 census, the population of the community and nearby areas was 54.

History
Herkimer was named after Herkimer, New York.  A post office was opened in Herkimer in 1878, and remained in operation until it was discontinued in 1974.

Demographics

For statistical purposes, the United States Census Bureau has defined this community as a census-designated place (CDP).

Education
The community is served by Marysville USD 364 public school district.

References

Further reading

External links
 Marshall County maps: Current, Historic, KDOT

Unincorporated communities in Marshall County, Kansas
Unincorporated communities in Kansas